Hostage is a 1985 spoken word and poetry album by Charles Bukowski. The single track was recorded live at Redondo Beach, California in April 1980.

References

1985 live albums
Spoken word albums by American artists
Live spoken word albums